
Gmina Zakrzówek is a rural gmina (administrative district) in Kraśnik County, Lublin Voivodeship, in eastern Poland.

Villages
Gmina Zakrzówek contains the villages and settlements of Bystrzyca, Góry, Józefin, Kopaniny, Lipno, Majdan-Grabina, Majorat, Rudnik Drugi, Rudnik Pierwszy, Studzianki, Studzianki-Kolonia, Sulów, Świerczyna, Tartak, Zakrzówek, Zakrzówek Nowy, Zakrzówek-Rudy and Zakrzówek-Wieś.

Neighbouring gminas
Gmina Zakrzówek is bordered by the gminas of Batorz, Bychawa, Kraśnik, Strzyżewice, Szastarka, Wilkołaz and Zakrzew.

References

Polish official population figures 2006

Zakrzowek
Kraśnik County